The following is a list of ecoregions in Cambodia.

Tropical and subtropical moist broadleaf forests
 Southern Annamites montane rain forests (Cambodia, Laos, Vietnam)
 Cardamom Mountains rain forests (Cambodia, Thailand, Vietnam)
 Tonle Sap freshwater swamp forests  (Cambodia, Vietnam)
 Tonle Sap-Mekong peat swamp forests  (Cambodia, Vietnam)

Tropical and subtropical dry broadleaf forests
 Central Indochina dry forests (Laos, Cambodia, Thailand, Vietnam)
 Southeastern Indochina dry evergreen forests (Cambodia, Laos, Thailand, Vietnam)

Mangroves
 Indochina mangroves (Vietnam, Thailand, Cambodia)

Freshwater ecoregions
Freshwater ecoregions:
 Mekong (Burma, Laos, Cambodia, Thailand, Vietnam)

References

 Wikramanayake, Eric; Eric Dinerstein; Colby J. Loucks; et al. (2002). Terrestrial Ecoregions of the Indo-Pacific: a Conservation Assessment. Washington, DC: Island Press

Cambodia
Ecoregions